Baptist Convention of Haiti is a Baptist Christian denomination, affiliated with the Baptist World Alliance, headquartered in Cap-Haïtien, Haiti.

History
The Baptist Convention of Haiti has its origins in a mission of the Baptist Missionary Society in 1823 in Cap-Haïtien.  In 1923, during U.S. occupation of Haiti, the American Baptist Home Mission Society established and worked at the union of Baptist churches.  The Convention is officially formed in 1964. 

In 1994, it established the Christian University of Northern Haiti in Limbé. 

According to a denomination census released in 2020, it claimed 112 churches and 50,000 members.

See also
 Bible
 Born again
 Baptist beliefs
 Worship service (evangelicalism)
 Jesus Christ
 Believers' Church

References

Baptist Christianity in Haiti
Baptist denominations in the Caribbean